Liliane Aimée Ackermann (née Weil) (1938–2007) was a French microbiologist, Jewish Community  pioneer, leader, writer, and lecturer.

Early life and education

Liliane Ackermann was born on September 3, 1938, in Strasbourg, France, the daughter of Lucien Weil and Béatrice Haas.
During World War II, her family took refuge in Voiron, Isère. They would remain there until 1956, when they moved back to Strasbourg.

After her Baccalauréat in 1956, she studied at the Faculty of Sciences at the Université Louis Pasteur of  Strasbourg, where she obtained her first Ph.D. (in  microbiology), in 1974. She later received a second Ph.D., at the Université de Strasbourg (Humanities), in 1999.

She married Henri Ackermann, a dentist and a community  activist, in 1959. They had seven children (Théo, Jacqui, Anne, Raoul, Eric, Charles, and  Marc). Henri and Liliane Ackermann formed a team,  for nearly half a century.

From 1956 to 2007, she taught in Strasbourg at the elementary and secondary levels but also to adults in Jewish  education. She taught also to Russian immigrants in  Germany. In parallel, from 1976 to 1996, she gave lectures at the Louis Pasteur University in biochemistry and microbiology.

Career 
Liliane and Henri Ackermann took charge in 1972 of the Youth Movement "Yeshurun" [in French written "Yechouroun"], a national religious group active all year round, and with winter and summer camps. A great number of Jewish leaders were formed there. Among them, René Gutman, Chief Rabbi of the Bas-Rhin, Gilles Bernheim, Chief Rabbi of the Synagogue de la  Rue de la Victoire in Paris,  Chief Rabbi of France from January 1, 2009 to April 11, 2013, and many others.

On February 1, 2009, at his Inauguration as Chief Rabbi of France, Gilles Bernheim recalled in his speech Liliane Ackermann: "I want to express what I owe to the leaders of the youth movement Yechouroun from which I come. Théo and Edith Klein of blessed memory, Liliane Ackermann of blessed memory and the friend so close to me, Henri Ackermann."

Liliane Ackermann got involved in reaching out to handicapped, women in distress, the elderly. In Strasbourg, her home was the locale to find counseling, advice, encouragement, but also serious learning at all levels.

She was a scientist by formation but also an accomplished  artist: the violin and piano were her favorite  instruments and drawing was her passion.

A rarity for a woman, anywhere, but particularly in France, she learned on  her own the Babylonian Talmud, and went on to study, thereafter, the Jerusalem Talmud.

On an official occasion, at the Palais de l'Elysée, in  Paris, meeting the President of France, Valéry Giscard d'Estaing, she introduced herself, listing her  credentials, and concluded:  "and I also educate my 7  children!".

At the age of 68, she died in Strasbourg, on February 3, 2007.

Bibliography
 "Judaism and Science"
"Judaism and Women"
"Judaism and Conversion".

References

External links
Kountras. Mme Liliane Ackermann. Adar 5767/Mars 2007
Site of Liliane Ackermann

1938 births
2007 deaths
Scientists from Strasbourg
Alsatian Jews
French women academics
French scholars
Jewish scientists
French Orthodox Jews
French microbiologists
Women microbiologists
Academic staff of the University of Strasbourg
20th-century French women scientists
Jewish women scientists